Traditional Populations , Traditional Peoples or Traditional Communities, under Brazilian law, are groups that have a culture that is different from the prevailing local culture and that maintain a way of life closely linked to the natural environment in which they live. Through its own forms - social organization, the use of territory and natural resources (with a subsistence relationship) - its socio-cultural-religious reproduction using knowledge transmitted orally and in daily practice.

Officially, according to the Federal Government, to be recognized as traditional, it is necessary to carry out daily production practices based on sustainable development.  It is estimated that in Brazil around 4.5 million people are part of these communities, occupying 25% of the national territory.

Government recognition 
In 2007, the Federal Government of Brazil formally recognized the existence of so-called traditional populations (Presidential Decree 6 040 of February 7),  expanding the recognition partially made in the 1988 Constitution (only indigenous and quilombola) covering the following communities: caboclo; caiçara; extractive; jangadeiro; fisherman; riverside; tapper; in addition to indigenous and quilombola. The law also established the "National Policy for the Sustainable Development of Traditional Peoples and Communities" (PNPCT), subordinated to the Ministry of the Environment.

List of traditional communities

References 

Ethnic groups in Brazil